The Channel 9 TV Tower also known as the Willoughby Tower or the TCN-9 TXA TV Tower, was a free-standing lattice tower with square cross section in the Sydney suburb of Willoughby. It was built as the broadcast transmitter for TCN, the Sydney flagship television station of the Nine Network being built above its studios. The tower has a base width of 112 feet and 347 tons of steel were used in its construction.

Completed in 1965, the tower stood 233 m (765 ft) tall and was the tallest free-standing lattice tower in Australia. The tower was the tallest structure in Sydney until the Sydney Tower was completed in 1981. Demolition of the tower commenced in April 2021 after TCN relocated to North Sydney with work completed in November 2021.

References

Buildings and structures demolished in 2021
Lattice towers
Nine Network
Towers completed in 1965
Towers in Australia
Willoughby, New South Wales
1965 establishments in Australia
2021 disestablishments in Australia